With Love is the fourth studio album by American country music artist John Conlee. It was released in 1981 via MCA Records. The album includes the singles "Could You Love Me (One More Time)" and "Miss Emily's Picture".

Track listing

Personnel
Adapted from liner notes.

Guitars: Barry "Byrd" Burton, Mark Casstevens, Brent Rowan
Dobro, Steel Guitar: Larry Sasser
Bass Guitar: Joe Osborn
Piano: Dennis Burnside
Drums: Eddie Bayers
Fiddle: Buddy Spicher
Lead Vocals: John Conlee
Background Vocals: John Conlee, Sherilyn Huffman, Wendy Suits, Judy Taylor, Dennis Wilson

Chart performance

References

1981 albums
John Conlee albums
MCA Records albums